Tenyiphe II is a village located in the Chümoukedima District of Nagaland and is a suburb of Chümoukedima, the district headquarters.

Demographics
Tenyiphe II is situated in the Chümoukedima District of Nagaland. As per the Population Census 2011, there are a total 289 households in Tenyiphe II. The total population of Tenyiphe II is 1550.

See also
Chümoukedima District

References

Villages in Chümoukedima district